Naoyuki Oguri (born 1963), who performs as simply Oguri, is a dancer and choreographer from Japan who lives in Los Angeles, California, where he works creating and teaching dance.  His work is influenced by the tradition of the Japanese Butoh style of dance.

Oguri was born in Tajimi in the Gifu Prefecture of Japan. Prior to coming to Los Angeles he studied with master Tatsumi Hijikata, the founder of a genre of Butoh dance whom Oguri credits as his inspiration for interest in the field.  He also studied and danced with Min Tanaka's Body Weather in a mountain village in Yamanashi Prefecture in rural Japan  where he met dancer and choreographer Roxanne Steinberg.   In 1990 he came to Los Angeles and married Steinberg.  In 2002 he was featured in the book In Other Los Angeleses: Multicentric Performance Art by Meiling Cheng. Oguri was also featured in the film Height of Sky a documentary by Morleigh Steinberg.

Subsequent works include Kalpa, performed at the Getty Center in Los Angeles in January 2012  as well as a performance of Cold Dream Colour as a member of the Arcane Collective at the REDCAT, part of the Walt Disney Concert Hall complex.

References

Living people
Japanese choreographers
Japanese male dancers
People from Gifu Prefecture
People from Los Angeles
1963 births